Thomas Farrell (1937 – 20 July 2012) was an Irish footballer who played as a centre half. He began his career at Home Farm and signed for Shamrock Rovers in 1957. The actor Colin Farrell is his nephew.

He earned two League of Ireland XI caps while at Glenmalure Park  and made seven appearances in the European Champion Clubs' Cup, UEFA Cup Winners' Cup and the Inter-Cities Fairs Cup against SK Rapid Wien and Valencia CF amongst others.

Farrell also made one appearance for the Republic of Ireland B in 1960 having already played for his country at schoolboy and youth level. He broke his nose while touring the US in the summer of 1961.

Farrell won his first FAI Cup medal in 1962 alongside his brother Eamonn. He shared a benefit game with Tony Byrne in May 1965.

In December 1965 Farrell was suspended by Rovers for a breach of discipline. He signed for Waterford United in December 1966.

Honours
League of Ireland: 2
  Shamrock Rovers - 1958/59, 1963/64
FAI Cup: 3
  Shamrock Rovers - 1962, 1964, 1965
League of Ireland Shield: 3
  Shamrock Rovers - 1962/63, 1963/64, 1964/65
Leinster Senior Cup: 2
  Shamrock Rovers - 1958, 1964
Dublin City Cup: 2
  Shamrock Rovers - 1959/60, 1963/64
Top Four Cup: 2
  Shamrock Rovers - 1957/58, 1965/66

References

Books
 The Hoops by Paul Doolan and Robert Goggins

Internet

1937 births
2012 deaths
League of Ireland players
Home Farm F.C. players
Republic of Ireland association footballers
Republic of Ireland youth international footballers
Republic of Ireland B international footballers
Shamrock Rovers F.C. players
Waterford F.C. players
League of Ireland XI players
Association football central defenders